Ricardo Domingos Barbosa Pereira (born 6 October 1993) is a Portuguese professional footballer who plays as a full-back for Premier League club Leicester City.

After starting out at Vitória de Guimarães – winning the 2013 Taça de Portugal and being the competition's top scorer in the process – he signed with Porto, being part of the squad that won the 2017–18 Primeira Liga but also spending two years on loan to French club Nice.

An international since 2015, Pereira represented Portugal at the 2018 World Cup.

Club career

Vitória Guimarães
Born in Lisbon of Cape Verdean descent, Pereira began playing youth football with local C.F. Benfica, signing in 2010 with Associação Naval 1º de Maio after a six-year spell at Sporting CP's academy. He moved to Vitória S.C. after only one year, completing his development with the Guimarães-based club.

Pereira made his first-team – and Primeira Liga – debut on 1 April 2012, playing 12 minutes in a 3–1 home win over F.C. Paços de Ferreira. He scored six goals in as many games in the 2012–13 edition of the Taça de Portugal, including the 2–1 winner in the final against S.L. Benfica as the Minho Province side won the tournament for the first time in their history.

Porto
On 16 April 2013, before the season was over, Pereira agreed to join FC Porto on 1 July, moving alongside teammate Tiago Rodrigues. He alternated constantly between the first and the second teams during his early tenure, also being reconverted into a full-back by manager Paulo Fonseca. His maiden appearance in the UEFA Champions League took place on 26 August 2014, when he replaced the injured Casemiro late into the 2–0 home victory over Lille OSC in the play-off round.

In summer 2015, after only 33 first-team appearances over two seasons, Pereira was loaned for two years to French club OGC Nice. He made his debut in Ligue 1 on 12 September, playing the entire 0–1 home loss to En Avant de Guingamp.

Pereira was voted as the French League's best full-back by the International Centre for Sports Studies in April 2016.

Leicester City

On 17 May 2018, a €25 million deal was agreed for Pereira to move to Leicester City. He made his Premier League debut on 10 August, playing the entire 2–1 away defeat against Manchester United. He scored his first goal while celebrating his 25th birthday, netting after a counter-attack in a 1–2 home loss to Everton. At the end of the campaign, he was voted both his team's Player of the Season and Players’ Player of the Season.

Pereira scored in consecutive wins over Tottenham Hotspur and Newcastle United in September 2019, both at the King Power Stadium, and the following 4 March he netted the only goal against Birmingham City in the fifth round of the FA Cup to put the Foxes into the last eight for the second time in eight years. Days later, he was ruled out for the rest of the season with an anterior cruciate ligament injury.

On 18 February 2022, Pereira signed a contract extension until 2026. On 14 April, his 88th-minute strike closed a 2–1 victory at PSV Eindhoven (also the aggregate score) and confirmed qualification to the semi-finals of the UEFA Europa Conference League.

International career
Pereira won 35 caps for Portugal at youth level, scoring 12 goals. He was part of the under-21 squad that finished second at the 2015 UEFA European Championship, contributing with four starting appearances and netting in the 5–0 semi-final drubbing of Germany.

On 6 November 2015, Pereira was called up to the full side for the second time, ahead of friendlies against Russia and Luxembourg. He made his debut in the former match, featuring eight minutes in the 1–0 defeat in Krasnodar.

Pereira was selected by manager Fernando Santos for his 2018 FIFA World Cup squad. He made his debut in the competition on 30 June, playing the entire 2–1 loss to Uruguay in the round of 16.

Career statistics

Club

International

Honours
Vitória Guimarães
Taça de Portugal: 2012–13

Porto
Primeira Liga: 2017–18

Leicester City
FA Cup: 2020–21
FA Community Shield: 2021

Portugal
UEFA European Under-21 Championship runner-up: 2015

Individual
Primeira Liga Team of the Year: 2017–18
Leicester City Player of the Season/Players' Player of the Season: 2018–19

References

External links

1993 births
Living people
Portuguese sportspeople of Cape Verdean descent
Black Portuguese sportspeople
Portuguese footballers
Footballers from Lisbon
Association football defenders
Association football wingers
Primeira Liga players
Liga Portugal 2 players
Vitória S.C. players
Vitória S.C. B players
FC Porto B players
FC Porto players
Ligue 1 players
OGC Nice players
Premier League players
Leicester City F.C. players
Portugal youth international footballers
Portugal under-21 international footballers
Portugal international footballers
2018 FIFA World Cup players
Portuguese expatriate footballers
Expatriate footballers in France
Expatriate footballers in England
Portuguese expatriate sportspeople in France
Portuguese expatriate sportspeople in England